The 1938 National Football League Draft was held on December 12, 1937, at the Sherman House Hotel in Chicago, Illinois. The draft consisted of 12 rounds and 110 player selections. It began with the Cleveland Rams using the first overall pick of the draft to select Corbett Davis.

Player selections

Round one

Round two

Round three

Round four

Round five

Round six

Round seven

Round eight

Round nine

Round ten

Round eleven

Round twelve

Hall of Famers
 Alex Wojciechowicz, center from Fordham, taken 1st round 6th overall by the Detroit Lions.
Inducted: Professional Football Hall of Fame class of 1968.
 Frank “Bruiser” Kinard, offensive tackle from Ole Miss, taken 3rd round 18th overall by the Brooklyn Dodgers.
Inducted: Professional Football Hall of Fame class of 1971.

Notable undrafted players

References

External links
 NFL.com – 1938 Draft
 databaseFootball.com – 1938 Draft
 Pro Football Hall of Fame 

National Football League Draft
Draft
1937 in sports in Illinois
1930s in Chicago
American football in Chicago
Events in Chicago
December 1937 sports events